The  Grimes Manufacturing Company was an American manufacturer of aircraft lighting systems located in Urbana, Ohio.

History 
The Grimes Manufacturing Company was founded by Warren G. Grimes in 1933.

During World War II, the company built an additional building to handle the increased production. At the same time, it built Grimes Field, which it continued to operate until 1987. It again expanded in 1966, when construction began on a new 42,000 square foot addition.

From the 1960s to the 1980s, the company operated a Beech 18 called the Grimes Flying Lab to test its lights.

In 1977, Grimes was purchased by the Midland-Ross Corporation. Less than two years later Midland-Ross announced its intention to purchase a building at the Greenwood County Airport in Greenwood, South Carolina for the manufacturing operations of Grimes. Then, in 1981, Midland-Ross acquired the Mansfield Aircraft Products Company and made it a subsidiary of what was by then the Grimes Division. The division was restructured in 1982, with it being split into Grimes Galley Products, Grimes Lighting Products, and Grimes EL Products. The Grimes Galley unit closed two years later. Following a consolidation in 1991, the company reemerged as Grimes Aerospace. In 1992, construction began on a 20,000 square foot expansion of the Greenwood facility.

It was purchased by AlliedSignal in 1997. The sale would later be questioned after it was revealed that AlliedSignal pressured credit ratings companies to ignore the unrated bonds of Grimes investors. AlliedSignal, which would later become Honeywell, maintains as presence at two separate locations in Urbana.

References

Notes

Bibliography 

 

Aircraft component manufacturers
Manufacturing companies based in Ohio